M178 may refer to

M-178 (Michigan highway), a former state highway
Mercedes-Benz M178 engine, an automobile engine
M178 gun mount, a mount used on the M109 howitzer